Andriy Koval (born 6 December 1983) is a professional Ukrainian football striker who plays for Arsenal in the Ukrainian First League. Played for Metalist in 2006–2008 season. Earlier played for FC Kharkiv.

Koval was born on 6 December 1983 in the city of Bila Tserkva, in the Ukrainian republic of the Soviet Union (in the Kyiv Oblast of present-day Ukraine).

External links 
Official Website Profile
Profile on EUFO
Profile on FootballSquads
 

1983 births
Living people
People from Bila Tserkva
Ukrainian footballers
FC Ros Bila Tserkva players
FC Metalist Kharkiv players
FC Kharkiv players
FC Arsenal Kharkiv players
FC Helios Kharkiv players
FC Arsenal-Kyivshchyna Bila Tserkva players
FC Hoverla Uzhhorod players
FC Naftovyk-Ukrnafta Okhtyrka players
Ukrainian Premier League players
Ukrainian First League players
Ukrainian Second League players
Association football forwards
Sportspeople from Kyiv Oblast